Carolyn Brent, also known as Carolyn A. Brent, is an American author, bodybuilder and elder-care legislation advocate. She is best known as an award-winning advocate and the author of the best-selling books, The Caregiver's Companion: Caring for Your Loved One Medically, Financially and Emotionally While Caring for Yourself and Why Wait? The Baby-Boomers Guide to Preparing Emotionally, Financially and Legally for a Parent’s Death. Brent is also the founder of the nonprofit organizations, Caregiver Story and Grandpa's Dream.

Career

Expertise
Brent is an expert on aging and sibling and family aging issues. She is a frequent public speaker and radio and television commentator on the topic of elder care. Brent is the host of "Across All Ages"  on NTV ABC.

In 2016 Brent won first place in the "60s and up" category at the 2016 National Physique Committee South Florida bodybuilding and bikini competition.

Authorship
Brent's books cover the topics of elder caregiving, estate planning, sibling contracts, and family legal and financial conversations.

In September 2011, Brent released Why Wait? The Baby-Boomers Guide to Preparing Emotionally, Financially and Legally for a Parent's Death. The idea for the book came from Brent's experiences as the primary caregiver for her father for 12 years. In January 2015, Brent released the self-help book in large print through Thorndike Press, The Caregiver's Companion: Caring for Your Loved One Medically, Financially and Emotionally While Caring for Yourself. According to the Library Journal, The Caregiver's Companion is "an excellent, comprehensive guide" for caregivers. Today's Caregivers Magazine recognized Brent's Caregiver's Companion with the 2015 Caregiver Friendly Award.

Books 
The Caregiver's Companion: Caring for Your Loved One Medically, Financially and Emotionally While Caring for Yourself
Why Wait? the Baby Boomers' Guide to Preparing Emotionally, Financially and Legally for a Parent's Death
The Caregiver's Legal Survival Guide
The Caregiver's Financial Survival Guide
The Caregiver's Emotional Survival Guide
Transforming Your Life Through Self-Care: A Guide to Tapping into Your Deep Beauty and Inner Worth
Amazing Grace: How My Father Taught Me to Rejoice in the Word of Our Father 
The Caregiver's Companion (2nd Ed.)

See also
 Elder care
 Geriatric care management
 Health advocacy

References

Further reading
 Informational Hearing of the Assembly Aging & Long-Term Care Committee, February 2013
 Congressman Jerry McNerney Letter to Carolyn Brent
Virtual Interview with Carolyn Brent

External links
NBC Bay Area – "How to Care for Your Parents"
"10 Tell-Tale Signs Your Aging Parents Can't Live Alone"
Mother's Day with Dr. Brenda Wade and Carolyn A. Brent, MBA
Tribune Broadcasting – Author and Award-winning Advocate Carolyn A. Brent shares her new book, “The Caregiver’s Companion”

Living people
American lawyers
American self-help writers
American women lawyers
Year of birth missing (living people)
American women non-fiction writers
21st-century American women